Opecoelus is a genus of trematodes in the family Opecoelidae.

Species
Opecoelus adsphaericus Manter & Van Cleave, 1951
Opecoelus arii Wang, 1982
Opecoelus atlanticus Zhukov, 1983
Opecoelus beliyai (Pande, 1937) Aken'Ova, 2007
Opecoelus bohaiensis Li, Qiu & Zhang, 1988
Opecoelus caballeroi Caballero Rodríguez, 1977
Opecoelus cameroni (Caballero y Caballero & Caballero Rodríguez, 1969) Aken'Ova, 2007
Opecoelus caulopsettae (Manter, 1954) Aken'Ova, 2007
Opecoelus crowcrofti Aken'Ova, 2007
Opecoelus goniistii Yamaguti, 1938
Opecoelus gonorhynchi (Gavrilyuk-Tkachuk, 1979) Aken'Ova, 2007
Opecoelus haduyngoi Nguyễn, 2012
Opecoelus himezi Yamaguti, 1952
Opecoelus inimici Yamaguti, 1934
Opecoelus jamunicus (Srivastava, 1968) Aken'Ova, 2007
Opecoelus kuhliae Yamaguti, 1970
Opecoelus lateolabracis Yamaguti, 1958
Opecoelus lobatus Ozaki, 1925
Opecoelus lotellae Manter, 1954
Opecoelus mastacembalii (Harshey, 1937) Aken'Ova, 2007
Opecoelus mehrii (Harshey, 1937) Aken'Ova, 2007
Opecoelus mexicanus Manter, 1940
Opecoelus minimus Tubangui, 1928
Opecoelus minor Yamaguti, 1934
Opecoelus mulloidichthydis Yamaguti, 1970
Opecoelus mutu Yamaguti, 1940
Opecoelus nipponicus Yamaguti, 1951
Opecoelus noblei Banerjee, 1965
Opecoelus ozaki (Layman, 1930) Yamaguti, 1954
Opecoelus pacificus Caballero y Caballero & Caballero Rodríguez, 1976
Opecoelus pagrosomi Yamaguti, 1958
Opecoelus pentedactylus (Manter, 1940) Aken'Ova, 2007
Opecoelus piriformis Yamaguti, 1952
Opecoelus platycephali Yamaguti, 1970
Opecoelus pomatomi Aken'Ova, 2007
Opecoelus pteroisi Shen, 1986
Opecoelus quadratus Ozaki, 1928
Opecoelus rhadinotus Manter, 1963
Opecoelus scorpaenidicola Prudhoe & Bray, 1973
Opecoelus sebastisci Yamaguti, 1958
Opecoelus sebastodis Yamaguti, 1934
Opecoelus sphæricus Ozaki, 1925
Opecoelus tasmanicus Crowcroft, 1947
Opecoelus ukigori Shimazu, 1988
Opecoelus variabilis Cribb, 1985
Opecoelus woolcockae Aken'Ova, 2007
Opecoelus xenistii Manter, 1940
Opecoelus zhifuensis Shen & Qiu, 1995

Species later synonymised with species of Opecoelus
Opecoelus beliyai (Pande, 1937) Aken'Ova, 2007
Opegaster beliyai Pande, 1937
Opecoelus cameroni (Caballero y Caballero & Caballero Rodríguez, 1969) Aken'Ova, 2007
Opegaster cameroni Caballero y Caballero & Caballero Rodríguez, 1969
Opecoelus caulopsettae (Manter, 1954) Aken'Ova, 2007
Opegaster caulopsettae Manter, 1954
Opecoelus gonorhynchi (Gavrilyuk-Tkachuk, 1979) Aken'Ova, 2007
Opegaster gonorhynchi Gavrilyuk-Tkachuk, 1979
Opecoelus jamunicus (Srivastava, 1968) Aken'Ova, 2007
Opegaster jamunicus Srivastava, 1968
Opecoelus mastacembalii (Harshey, 1937) Aken'Ova, 2007
Opegaster mastacembalii Harshey, 1937
Opecoelus mehrii (Harshey, 1937) Aken'Ova, 2007
Opegaster mehrii Harshey, 1937
Opecoelus mexicanus Manter, 1940
Podocotyle boneti Caballero y Caballero & Caballero Rodríguez, 1970
Opecoelus ozaki (Layman, 1930) Yamaguti, 1954
Opegaster ozaki Layman, 1930
Opecoelus pentedactylus (Manter, 1940) Aken'Ova, 2007
Opegaster pentedactylus Manter, 1940

References

Opecoelidae
Plagiorchiida genera